Gilbert & Dean (1802–1823) was a banking and publishing firm in Boston, Massachusetts, run by Samuel Gilbert and Thomas Dean in the early 19th-century. As publishers, they produced works by Joseph Croswell, David Humphreys, Susanna Rowson, John Sylvester John Gardiner, Benjamin Dearborn and others, as well as the Boston Weekly Magazine. They kept an office on State Street.

History

Samuel Gilbert (1777-ca.1867) and Thomas Dean (1779–1826) established their partnership in 1802. Both Dean and Gilbert had trained with Boston newspaperman Benjamin Russell, of the Columbian Centinel.

In 1802, they began publishing the Boston Weekly Magazine.  Susanna Rowson served as editor, and also contributed serialised fiction and other pieces. "As an early attempt to describe the manners, reprehend the follies, cultivate the taste and soften the customs of the people, the Boston Weekly Magazine is not discreditable to American literature." The magazine ceased in 1805. Besides the weekly, the firm published numerous other titles. They kept an office at "no. 56, State-street, Boston, where printing in all its branches, is executed with neatness, accuracy and dispatch;" by 1804, they'd moved to "no.78, State-Street, corner of Wilson's Lane."

Meanwhile, in addition to printing, the firm's business also encompassed banking. Gilbert & Dean described themselves as "lottery, stock and exchange brokers." Among other activities, they notified the public of counterfeit currency, describing details by which people might recognize forgeries. One notorious counterfeiter, Stephen Burroughs, mocked Gilbert & Dean's anti-counterfeit efforts:  "Gentleman, Having often seen your 'only sure guide to bank bills,' and admiring your kind labors for the public weal, in detecting the works of those 'ingenious rogues,' I have enclosed and forwarded to your Exchange Office, a bill on the Shipton Bank. ... I wish, Gentlemen, you would ... strictly examine all bills on the aforesaid bank, by the enclosed genuine bill; for such is the depravity of man, and such the success of counterfeiting, that I lately observed in one of your newspapers, that patent Buck Wheat Pancakes had been so exactly counterfeited in New-Jersey, that none except the Officers of the Pancake Exchange could distinguish them from the originals!!! -- I solicit your friendship gentlemen, in this important business..."

Gilbert & Dean invested in the gigantic, 7-story, arguably grandiose Exchange Coffee House, built in Boston in 1809. When the Exchange burnt to the ground in 1818, Gilbert & Dean, as major investors, lost thousands of dollars. However the firm regained its momentum, a tribute perhaps to the business skills of Dean and Gilbert. Around 1823 the firm kept its office in the Old State House.

The partnership ended "by mutual consent" in 1823. Gilbert formed a new financial business with his sons Benjamin R. Gilbert and Samuel Gilbert, Jr. (1801–1897). Dean also continued in the financial industry.

References

Further reading

Published by Gilbert & Dean
 Boston Weekly Magazine. v.1 (1802–1803); v.2 (1803–1804); v.3 (1804–1805).
 Joseph Croswell. A new world planted, or, The adventures of the forefathers of New-England who landed in Plymouth, Dec. 22, 1620: an historical drama in five acts. 1802.
 William Sullivan. An oration, pronounced July 4, 1803: at the request of the inhabitants of the town of Boston, in commemoration of the anniversary of American independence.
 Constitution of the Boston Light Infantry: established, May, 1798, revised and ratified, January, 1803. 1803.
 Rules and regulations of the Attentive Fire Society: to which is annexed, members names, places of abode, and business. 1803.
 Peres Fobes. A sermon, delivered January 26, 1803, at the ordination of the Rev. George Barstow: over the Second Church and Society in Pembroke. 1803.
 James Kendall. A sermon, delivered at Plymouth, September 4, 1803. Occasioned by the death of the Rev. David Tappan ... who died August 23—aged fifty-one. 1803.
 Jerusalem Lodge. Jachin and Boaz; or, An authentic key to the door of free-masonry, both ancient and modern. 1803.
 Report of the committee of the town convention: The delegates from the several wards of the town of Boston, for the purpose of "considering what alterations in the county and town government may be necessary, and to devise a plan therefor," report, the following plan... 1804.
 Susanna Rowson. Miscellaneous poems. 1804.
 Order of performance, of the yearly exhibition of the Franklin Musical Society: at the Rev. Dr. West's meeting-house [i.e., Hollis Street Church, Boston], Monday evening, March 26, 1804. 1804.
 David Humphreys. A valedictory discourse, delivered before the Cincinnati of Connecticut, in Hartford, July 4, 1804, at the dissolution of the society. 1804.
  John Sylvester J. Gardiner. A sermon preached at Trinity Church, December 9, 1804, on the death of the Right Reverend Samuel Parker, D.D. Bishop of the Protestant Episcopal Church in the state of Massachusetts. 1804.
 Benjamin Dearborn. Description of the manner of using Dearborn's Facility for casting interest. 1805.
 The constitution of the Associated Housewright Society of the Town of Boston: instituted October, 1804. 1805.
 Calcutta goods at auction, on Friday, 4 October, inst. at 10 o'clock, at the wharf of Wm. Gray, jun. Esq. Charlestown: the cargo of the ship Ulysses, from Calcutta, consisting of 301 bales piece goods. 1805.
 Addresses delivered before the Boston Federal Band, on Saturday afternoon, July 6, 1805. 
 Trufant's Family Almanac and Daily Register. 1806.
 Henry Alline. The Life and Journal of the Rev. Mr. Henry Alline. 1806.

Works about Gilbert & Dean
 Frank Luther Mott. "Boston Weekly Magazine." A History of American Magazines, Volume I, 1741-1850. Harvard U.P., 1930; p. 247+

External links
 Open Library. Items related to Gilbert & Dean

1802 establishments in Massachusetts
1823 disestablishments in Massachusetts
Financial District, Boston
19th century in Boston
Publishing companies established in 1802
Defunct book publishing companies of the United States
Book publishing companies based in Massachusetts
Defunct banks of the United States
Banks based in Massachusetts
Defunct companies based in Massachusetts
American companies established in 1802
American companies disestablished in 1823